Brampton is a small village and parish in the county of Norfolk, England, in the Bure Valley, east of Aylsham.

History
Brampton was the subject of an archeological excavation in the 1960s which revealed the existence of a Roman bath house and almost 140 pottery kilns.

Brampton derives from the Old English for a farmstead or village with abundant shrubs or bushes.

In the Domesday Book, Brampton is recorded of consisting of 30 households owned by William of Warenne and Ralph of Beaufour.

Brampton's St. Peter's Church is one of the 124 surviving round tower churches in Norfolk with a Fifteenth Century octagonal tower addition. The church was significantly remodelled during the Victorian era.

Transport
Brampton station is an intermediate halt on the Bure Valley Railway.

War Memorial
Brampton War Memorial is located in St. Peter's Churchyard and is a granite cross. It bears the following names for the First World War:
 Private Herbert C. Bircham (d.1917), 2nd Battalion, Royal Berkshire Regiment
 Private Richard M. Patrick (1897-1917), 1st Battalion, Essex Regiment
 Private John F. Vincent (1882-1918), 101st Company, Labour Corps
 Private Albert V. Spinks (1898-1917), 11th Battalion, Middlesex Regiment
 Private William Bircham (d.1915), 1/5th Battalion, Royal Norfolk Regiment
 Private Percy W. Watts (d.1917), 1/5th Battalion, Royal Norfolk Regiment
 Private Leslie E. Watts (1895-1916), 7th Battalion, Royal Norfolk Regiment
 Private Reginald J. R. Abel (1897-1916), 9th Battalion, Royal Norfolk Regiment
 Private John H. Bircham (1883-1915), 9th Battalion, Royal Norfolk Regiment
 Driver Allan C. Self (1889-1918), 18th Ammunition Column, Royal Field Artillery

And, the following for the Second World War:
 Driver Geoffrey A. Martins (1920-1944), Royal Army Service Corps

Notes

External links

Broadland
Villages in Norfolk
Civil parishes in Norfolk
Archaeology of the kingdom of East Anglia
Archaeological sites in Norfolk
Roman sites in Norfolk
Ancient Roman baths in England